The State of Law Coalition ( I'tilāf Dawlat al-Qānūn), also known as Rule of Law Coalition, is an Iraqi political coalition formed for the 2009 Iraqi governorate elections by the Prime Minister of Iraq at the time, Nouri al-Maliki, of the Islamic Dawa Party.

The name was an emphasis on the improved security situation which Maliki's government had achieved through the Battle of Basra and other operations of the Iraqi Security Forces.

Due to disagreements with the Islamic Supreme Council of Iraq and the Sadrists, the Dawa Party decided not to join the Iraqi National Alliance for the 2010 Iraqi parliamentary election, but run in their own coalition: the State of Law Coalition.

2009 governorate elections

In the 2009 Iraqi governorate elections, the State of Law Coalition was composed of several political blocs:
Islamic Dawa Party – led by Iraqi Prime Minister Nouri al-Maliki
Islamic Dawa Party – Iraq Organisation – led by Hashim Al-Mosawy
Independent Bloc – led by Iraqi Oil Minister Hussain al-Shahristani
Solidarity Bloc – led by former minister of state and Iraqi MP Qassim Daoud
Islamic Union of Iraqi Turkoman – led by Iraqi MP Abbas al-Bayati
Kurdish Feli Fraternity Movement
Shaabani Uprising Bloc 1991
Independents, there were also numerous independent candidates in the list.

Results
The State of Law Coalition came out as the largest list receiving 19.1% of the vote and 126 out of 440 seats.

2010 parliamentary election
In the 2010 Iraqi parliamentary election, the following parties were part of the State of Law Coalition:
Islamic Dawa Party – led by Iraqi Prime Minister Nouri al-Maliki
Islamic Dawa Party – Iraq Organisation – led by Hashim Al-Mosawy
Anbar Salvation National Front – led by Sheikh Ali Hatem al-Suleiman
Independent Arab Movement – led by former Deputy Prime Minister Abid Mutlak al-Jubouri
United Independent Iraqi Bloc – led by Thaer al-Feyli
Independent Iraqi Kafaat Gathering – led by government spokesman Ali al-Dabbagh
The Gathering—Al-Tajamo – led by former Iraqi National List members Mahdi al-Hafez and Safiyah Suheil
Islamic Union of Iraqi Turkoman – led by Abbas al-Bayati
"The Independents" led by Iraqi Oil Minister Hussain al-Shahristani
Independents, there were again numerous independent candidates in the list initially including defence minister Qadir al-Obeidi but he was banned from joining due to Ba'ath party links.

Results

2013 governorate elections
In the 2013 Iraqi governorate elections, the State of Law Coalition was composed of several political blocs:
Islamic Dawa Party – led by Iraqi Prime Minister Nouri al-Maliki
Islamic Dawa Party – Iraq Organisation
Independent Bloc – led by Iraqi Oil Minister Hussain al-Shahristani
Badr Organization – led by Hadi Al-Amiri
National Reform Trend – led by former Iraqi Prime Minister Ibrahim al-Jaafari
Islamic Virtue Party – led by Abd al-Rahim al-Hasini
Solidarity Bloc – led by former minister of state and Iraqi MP Qassim Daoud
Islamic Union of Iraqi Turkoman – led by Iraqi MP Abbas al-Bayati
White Iraqiya Bloc – led by Hassan Alawi
Kurdish Feli Fraternity Movement
Shaabani Uprising Bloc 1991
Independents, there were also numerous independent candidates in the list.

Electoral history

References

2009 establishments in Iraq
Islamic political parties in Iraq
Shia Islamic political parties
Political parties established in 2009
Political party alliances in Iraq
Axis of Resistance